Pongsagorn Samattanared (born April 3, 1992) is a Thai professional footballer who plays as a goalkeeper for Thai League 2 club Suphanburi.

References

External links
 at Soccerway

1992 births
Living people
Pongsagorn Samattanared
Association football goalkeepers
Pongsagorn Samattanared
Pongsagorn Samattanared
Nakhon Si United F.C. players